Lefokastro is a fishing village on the Pagasetic Gulf,  from Argalasti and  from Volos. Lefokastro is part of the community and the municipal unit of Argalasti in Magnesia, Greece.

References

Populated places in Pelion